The Suffragette penny is the name given to surviving examples of pre-decimal British pennies that were defaced by British suffragettes. They were a more subtle form of protest than window breaking and arson. There are currently only 10 or 11 pennies known to exist and all are believed to date from 1913.

Each penny was hand stamped using metal punches and a hammer. Of the existing examples, all have the words across the head of the king, either Edward VII or George V. The exception to this is the three coins minted during the reign of Queen Victoria, where the words are on the tail. The surviving coins can be identified by the similarities in the 'T', 'M', 'E' and 'O'.

Press reports of the time suggest that the suffragettes were taking inspiration from anarchists who were known to stamp coins with the words "Vive L'Anarchie" on coins. At 3 cm in diameter, pre-decimal pennies were large enough for messages to show clearly on them. As they were made of bronze and of low value, they would have been impractical for the Bank of England to withdraw from circulation. However, defaced coins were often rejected by shopkeepers, which prevented them entering circulation, lessening their impact as a propaganda tool. 

In 2010, the coin held by the British Museum was featured as part of A History of the World in 100 Objects, a joint project between the museum and BBC Radio 4. However, Hockenhull notes that while its inclusion brought a greater awareness to the coins, it also created a market for counterfeits and imitations. According to him, there are only 10 coins that can be considered true suffragette pennies. Although all the coins are referred to as pennies, one of the surviving coins is actually a half crown.

One coin, which was uncovered by a detectorist at Rievaulx Abbey, Yorkshire in the 1980s, has a hole through it and was likely worn as a pendant at some point. It is also the latest of the coins, minted in 1913, which gives the likely date of defacement, as most suffragette activity ceased with the outbreak of World War I the following year.

References

First-wave feminism
Social history of the United Kingdom
Women's Social and Political Union
Women's suffrage in the United Kingdom